Svetlana Yuryevna Bubnenkova-Stolbova (Russian Светлана Юрьевна Бубненкова; born 2 January 1973 in Izhevsk, Udmurtia) is a racing cyclist from Russia. She represented her native country at three Summer Olympics: 1996, 2000 and 2004. Her biggest achievement was winning the 2002 Giro d'Italia Femminile. Bubnenkova twice won the world title in the women's team time trial (1993, 1994). She tested positive for the use of EPO in the Tour Féminin en Limousin 2006. In June 2007 she was suspended for two years by the French doping association. Later the UCI adopted this suspension, but due to miscommunications Bubnenkova continued to race in 2007. At the end of 2007 the UCI disqualified Bubnenkova in all races she started between June and September 2007.

Palmarès
Source:

1993
 1st  World Team Time Trial Championships
with Olga Sokolova, Valentina Polkhanova & Aleksandra Koliaseva
 1st Chrono Champenois-Trophée Européen
 2nd National Time Trial Championships
1994
 1st  World Team Time Trial Championships
with Olga Sokolova, Valentina Polkhanova & Aleksandra Koliaseva
 1st  National Time Trial Championships
 1st overall Tour de Bretagne
 2nd National Road Race Championships
 2nd Chrono Champenois-Trophée Européen
1995
 3rd Eschborn–Frankfurt City Loop
 3rd overall Tour de l'Aude Cycliste Féminin
 3rd National Time Trial Championships
1996
 1st  National Road Race Championships
 2nd overall Tour de l'Aude Cycliste Féminin
18th Olympic Games Time Trial
1997
 2nd overall Tour de l'Aude Cycliste Féminin
1999
 2nd overall Giro d'Italia Femminile
 2nd overall Giro del Trentino
2000
 1st stage 7 Grande Boucle Féminine Internationale
 1st stage 6A & 7 Giro d'Italia Femminile
 1st  National Road Race Championships
 3rd overall Giro del Trentino
 5th Olympic Games Road Race
2001
 2nd National Road Race Championships
2002
 1st overall Giro d'Italia Femminile
1st stage 3 & 6
 1st  National Road Race Championships
 1st Trofeo Alfredo Binda
 1st GP Suisse Féminin
 3rd National Time Trial Championships
2003
 1st Bern-Oberbottigen
 1st  National Road Race Championships
 1st  National Time Trial Championships
 1st Sparkassen Giro Bochum
 3rd Berner Rundfahrt
2004
 2nd National Time Trial Championships
 8th World Road Cycling Championships
2005
 1st overall Emakumeen Euskal Bira
1st stage 1
 1st overall Giro del Trentino
1st prologue
 1st  National Time Trial Championships
 1st stage 8 Giro d'Italia Femminile
 1st stage 2, 3, 4 & 5 Tour de l'Ardèche
 2nd overall Giro della Toscana Int. Femminile
 1st stage 3
 3rd National Road Race Championships
 3rd overall Giro di San Marino
2006
1st overall Giro di San Marino
1st stage 2
1st overall Giro del Trentino
1st stage 1 & 2
1st Overall Giro della Toscana Int. Femminile
1st stage 5
2nd Russian National Time Trial Championships
2nd overall Tour Féminin en Limousin
3rd overall Geelong Tour
3rd Coppa dei Laghi
3rd overall Route de France Féminine
1st stage 8
9th World Road Cycling Championships
2007
1st Futur Géant de la Route CC Hollerich
1st stage 8 Giro d'Italia Femminile
1st Critérium International Feminin
1st overall Tour Féminin en Limousin
1st stage 1 & 4
1st Critérium des Championnes
2nd National Time Trial Championships
2nd overall Route de France Féminine
1st stage 2, 5, 6 & 7
2nd Trophée des Cyclistines
3rd overall Giro del Trentino
2009
1st GP Elsy Jacobs
1st Classic Féminine Vienne Poitou-Charentes
3rd overall Giro del Trentino
3rd National Time Trial Championships
2010
3rd overall Giro del Trentino
2011
2nd National Road Race Championships
3rd overall Gracia–Orlová
1st prologue
3rd Russian National Track Cycling Championships (team pursuit)
with Natalia Boyarskaya & Irina Molicheva
2012
 5th World Team Time Trial Championships
with Boyarskaya, Kasper, Kupfernagel, Molicheva & Zabelinsaya
2013
1st  National Road Race Championships
3rd overall Tour de Bretagne Féminin

References

 
 

1973 births
Living people
Sportspeople from Izhevsk
Russian female cyclists
Cyclists at the 1996 Summer Olympics
Cyclists at the 2000 Summer Olympics
Cyclists at the 2004 Summer Olympics
Olympic cyclists of Russia
UCI Road World Champions (women)